The Robert F. Kennedy Community Schools, called the RFK Community Schools, is a complex of public schools in Los Angeles, California. This was formerly the site of the Ambassador Hotel, the site of the June 1968 assassination of presidential candidate United States Senator Robert F. Kennedy.

The school was designed for 4,200 students, which can be filled by students within a nine-block radius. The schools cost $578 million to build, making it the most expensive public school in the United States.

History and construction

The site was home to the Ambassador Hotel, the site of the June 1968 assassination of presidential candidate, United States senator from New York, and former U.S. Attorney General Robert F. Kennedy.

Los Angeles Unified School District (known as LAUSD) had wanted to build a school on the site since the 1980s, but was met with resistance: real estate developer Donald Trump (who later became President) wanted to build the world's tallest building on the site, and Mayor Tom Bradley, Nate Holden, and LA's business community were strongly opposed to using the location as a school.

The hotel was razed in 2006. The new school, designed by the architects of Gonzalez Goodale, built a modern interpretation of the original hotel.

Along Wilshire Boulevard is a memorial pocket park to Robert F. Kennedy. The school itself is six stories, with a replica of the Cocoanut Grove nightclub.

The Los Angeles Conservancy fought the construction of RFK Community Schools for a long time. They had proposed a plan for a “small learning community” that would still preserve the Ambassador Hotel. On October 25, 2007, the Los Angeles Conservancy filed a lawsuit against LAUSD. The school board was not following the guidelines for construction that the LA Conservancy had expected. After the decision was voted on by the Board of Education, the president of the LA Conservancy stated that while the Ambassador Hotel was not saved, an agreement had been reached with LAUSD to preserve many other historical sites.

The complex features fine art murals and a marble memorial depicting the complex's namesake, a public park, a swimming pool and preservation of pieces of the original hotel.

Originally designed as a large comprehensive K-12 school that would have over 2,400 students, in 2008 LAUSD Local District 4 determined the facility would host wall-to-wall pilot schools – innovative small schools that have charter-like autonomy over their budget, curriculum and assessment, governance, schedule and staffing, but are part of the public school system.

Each pilot school has a social justice mission.

The commission's major recommendation called for a social justice theme to permeate the curriculum, extending from kindergarten through high school, that would reflect Senator Kennedy's commitment throughout his public life.

In 2010, two lawsuits were filed, alleging molestation of two children at New Open World Academy, one of the small schools at RFK that opened in 2009.

The five pilot high schools share the same athletic program and compete in high school sports as the RFK Bobcats.

Reception
The project was originally conceived in 1991 by a group of ten grassroots community leaders, under the acronym of the L.A. CRUSADERS, including Lisa Sarno, Ronald Lazar and other respected neighborhood improvement organizers. Ronald Lazar met with two representatives of Donald Trump's organization. Ronald Lazar articulated the plan for the school and suggested Donald Trump seek a better location for the world's tallest building. The Trump Organization responded by changing their plans. Assemblyman Mike Roos and his chief aide, Michael Caccioti, arranged for the group to meet in a local church, where ideas were born, rallies were organized, and eventually resulted in an architectural model depicting the combination of schools, community green space, centralized social services, commercial space, low-cost housing and a solution to the expense of $200,000 annually spent on the daily bussing of thousands of students to schools as far away as North Hollywood. The L.A. CRUSADERS organized for busloads of community members to travel to the State Assembly in Sacramento, where they lobbied successfully for $53 million to purchase the site for the project in 1991. No one then could have anticipated the final cost of $565 million.

The school features a marble memorial depicting Robert F. Kennedy, a manicured public park, and a state-of-the-art swimming pool. Of these amenities, Ben Austin, executive director of Parent Revolution who sits on the California Board of Education, stated, "New buildings are nice, but when they're run by the same people who've given us a 50 percent dropout rate, they're a big waste of taxpayer money... Parents aren't fooled."

An Associated Press article called it a "Taj Mahal" school and reflected, "nearly 3,000 teachers have been laid off over the past two years, the academic year and programs have been slashed. The district also faces a $640 million shortfall and some schools persistently rank among the nation's lowest performing."

Sam Lubell of The Architect's Newspaper commented, "the overall design is not really rooted in anything except maybe the city’s obsession with loosely recreating the past," and "If anything it's a painful reminder of what was there before; an authentic piece of LA history that's been replaced by a loose nod to it. Much of its neighborhood, which was once one of Hollywood's most electric areas, has the same feeling."

This state-of-the-art facility consists of six different schools ranging from kindergarten to twelfth grade and enrolls 4,260 students. The construction cost per seat was $135,000. This is 40 percent higher than the other schools that were constructed in the central Los Angeles area over the past two years. While the school is the most expensive in LAUSD and the nation, the most expensive school per seat in LAUSD is the High School for the Visual and Performing Arts.

Schools

 Ambassador School of Global Education (ASGE), Grades K-5
 Ambassador School of Global Leadership (ASGL), Grades 6-12
 Los Angeles High School of the Arts (LAHSA), Grades 9-12
 New Open World Academy (NOW), Grades K-12
 School for the Visual Arts & Humanities (SVAH), Grades 9-12
 UCLA Community School (UCLA-CS), Grades K-12

References

External links

Official website
Individual Community School profiles:
https://schooldirectory.lausd.net/schooldirectory/SchoolPage?locationId=2369
https://schooldirectory.lausd.net/schooldirectory/SchoolPage?locationId=2772
https://schooldirectory.lausd.net/schooldirectory/SchoolPage?locationId=2771
https://schooldirectory.lausd.net/schooldirectory/SchoolPage?locationId=7771
https://schooldirectory.lausd.net/schooldirectory/SchoolPage?locationId=8501
https://schooldirectory.lausd.net/schooldirectory/SchoolPage?locationId=7783
https://schooldirectory.lausd.net/schooldirectory/SchoolPage?locationId=8206
https://schooldirectory.lausd.net/schooldirectory/SchoolPage?locationId=7780
https://schooldirectory.lausd.net/schooldirectory/SchoolPage?locationId=2838

Memorials to Robert F. Kennedy
Los Angeles Unified School District schools
High schools in Los Angeles
Schools in Los Angeles
Public elementary schools in California
Public middle schools in California
Public high schools in California
Koreatown, Los Angeles
Wilshire, Los Angeles
2010 establishments in California
Educational institutions established in 2010